A carbon footprint is the total greenhouse gas (GHG) emissions caused by an individual, event, organization, service, place or product, expressed as carbon dioxide equivalent (CO2e). Greenhouse gases, including the carbon-containing gases carbon dioxide and methane, can be emitted through the burning of fossil fuels, land clearance, and the production and consumption of food, manufactured goods, materials, wood, roads, buildings, transportation and other services.

In most cases, the total carbon footprint cannot be calculated exactly because of inadequate knowledge of data about the complex interactions between contributing processes, including the influence of natural processes that store or release carbon dioxide. For this reason, Wright, Kemp, and Williams proposed the following definition of a carbon footprint:

The Greenhouse Gas Protocol has extended the range of gases. 

The global average annual carbon footprint per person in 2014 was about 5 tonnes CO2e. Although there are many ways to calculate a carbon footprint, the Nature Conservancy suggests that the average carbon footprint for a U.S. citizen is 16 tons. This is one of the highest rates in the world, leading to new policies implemented to reduce carbon footprint. Scholars estimated that New York City can eliminate the carbon footprint of its buildings by 2050. Based on city documents and national statistics, a significant measure directly controlled by New York is the elimination of carbon emissions from municipal district heating, which may account for up to 30% of New York city’s reported carbon emissions and 58% of the energy-related carbon emissions.

The use of household carbon footprint calculators originated when oil producer BP hired Ogilvy to create an "effective propaganda" campaign to shift responsibility of climate change-causing pollution away from the corporations and institutions that created a society where carbon emissions are unavoidable and onto personal lifestyle choices. The term "carbon footprint" was also popularized by BP.

Background 
Human activities are one of the main causes of greenhouse gas emissions. These increase the earth's temperature and are emitted from the use of fossil fuels (coal, oil and gas), particularly in energy and transportation. The major effects of such practices mainly consist of climate changes, such as extreme precipitation and acidification and warming of oceans. Climate change has been occurring since the start of the Industrial Revolution in the 1820s. Due to humans' heavy reliance on fossil fuels, energy usage, and constant deforestation, the amount of greenhouse gas in the atmosphere is increasing, which makes reducing a greenhouse gas footprint harder to achieve. However, there are several ways to reduce one's greenhouse gas footprint, such as changing eating habits (reducing meat and dairy, as well as food waste), using more energy efficient appliances at home, buying less in general (particularly throwaway items, such as fast fashion) and travelling less (particularly reducing air travel).

Greenhouse gases (GHGs) are gases that increase the temperature of the Earth due to their absorption of infrared radiation. Although some emissions are natural, the rate of which they are being produced has increased because of humans. These gases are emitted from fossil fuel usage in electricity, in heat and transportation, as well as being emitted as byproducts of manufacturing. The most common GHGs are carbon dioxide (CO2), methane (CH4), nitrous oxide (N2O), and many fluorinated gases. A greenhouse gas footprint is the numerical quantity of these gases that a single entity emits. The calculations can be computed ranging from a single person to the entire world.

The latest climate science is published in the IPCC Sixth Assessment Report. The report presents key scientific findings linking the increase in anthropogenic GHGs emissions in current climate change. According to the report, it is only possible to avoid warming of 1.5 °C or 2 °C if massive and immediate cuts in greenhouse gas emissions are made.

Origin of the concept
The concept and name of the carbon footprint was derived from the ecological footprint concept, which was developed by William E. Rees and Mathis Wackernagel in the 1990s at the University of British Columbia. While carbon footprints are usually reported in tons of emissions (CO2-equivalent) per year, ecological footprints are usually reported in comparison to what the planet can renew. This assesses the number of "earths" that would be required if everyone on the planet consumed resources at the same level as the person calculating their ecological footprint. The carbon footprint is one part of the ecological footprint. Carbon footprints are more focused than ecological footprints since they merely measure emissions of gases that cause climate change into the atmosphere.

Carbon footprint is one of a family of footprint indicators, which also include ecological footprints, water footprints and land footprints.

The idea of a personal carbon footprint was popularized by a large advertising campaign of the fossil fuel company BP in 2005, designed by Ogilvy. It instructed people to calculate their personal footprints and provided ways for people to "go on a low-carbon diet". This strategy, also employed by other major fossil fuel companies borrowed heavily from previous campaigns by the tobacco industry and plastics industry to shift the blame for negative consequences of those industries (under-age smoking, cigarette butt pollution, and plastic pollution) onto individual choices. 

BP made no attempt to reduce its own carbon footprint, instead expanding its oil drilling into the 2020s. However, the strategy had some success, with a rise in consumers concerned about their own personal actions, and creation of multiple carbon footprint calculators.

Measuring carbon footprints

An individual's, nation's, or organization's carbon footprint can be measured by undertaking a GHG emissions assessment, a life cycle assessment, or other calculative activities denoted as carbon accounting. Once the size of a carbon footprint is known, a strategy can be devised to reduce it, for example, by technological developments, energy efficiency improvements, better process and product management, changed Green Public or Private Procurement (GPP), carbon capture, consumption strategies, carbon offsetting and others.

For calculating personal carbon footprints, several free online carbon footprint calculators exist including a few supported by publicly available peer-reviewed data and calculations including the University of California, Berkeley's CoolClimate Network research consortium and CarbonStory. These websites ask you to answer more or less detailed questions about your diet, transportation choices, home size, shopping and recreational activities, usage of electricity, heating, and heavy appliances such as dryers and refrigerators, and so on. The website then estimates your carbon footprint based on your answers to these questions. A systematic literature review was conducted to objectively determine the best way to calculate individual/household carbon footprints. This review identified 13 calculation principles and subsequently used the same principles to evaluate the 15 most popular online carbon footprint calculators. A recent study's results by Carnegie Mellon's Christopher Weber found that the calculation of carbon footprints for products is often filled with large uncertainties. The variables of owning electronic goods such as the production, shipment, and previous technology used to make that product, can make it difficult to create an accurate carbon footprint. It is important to question, and address the accuracy of Carbon Footprint techniques, especially due to its overwhelming popularity.

Calculating the carbon footprint of industry, product, or service is a complex task. One tool industry uses Life-cycle assessment (LCA), where carbon footprint may be one of many factors taken into consideration when assessing a product or service. The International Organization for Standardization has a standard called ISO 14040:2006 that has the framework for conducting an LCA study. ISO 14060 family of standards provides further sophisticated tools for quantifying, monitoring, reporting and validating or verifying of GHG emissions and removals. Another method is through the Greenhouse Gas Protocol, a set of standards for tracking greenhouse gas emissions (GHG) across scope 1, 2 and 3 emissions within the value chain.

Predicting the carbon footprint of a process is also possible through estimations using the above standards. By using Emission intensities/Carbon intensities and the estimated annual use of fuel, chemical, or other inputs, the carbon footprint can be determined while a process is being planned/designed.

Direct carbon emissions
Direct or 'scope 1' carbon emissions come from sources that are directly from the site that is producing a product or delivering a service. An example for industry would be the emissions related to burning a fuel on site. On the individual level, emissions from personal vehicles or gas burning stoves would fall under scope 1.

Indirect carbon emissions

Indirect carbon emissions are emissions from sources upstream or downstream from the process being studied, also known as scope 2 or scope 3 emissions.

Examples of upstream, indirect carbon emissions may include:
 Transportation of materials/fuels
 Any energy used outside of the production facility
 Wastes produced outside of the production facility

Examples of downstream, indirect carbon emissions may include:
 Any end-of-life process or treatments
 Product and waste transportation
 Emissions associated with selling the product

Scope 2 emissions are the other indirect related to purchased electricity, heat, and/or steam used on site.

Scope 3 emissions are all other indirect emissions derived from the activities of an organisation but from sources which they do not own or control. The GHG Protocol's Corporate Value Chain (Scope 3) Accounting and Reporting Standard allows companies to assess their entire value chain emissions impact and identify where to focus reduction activities.

Reporting
In the US, the EPA has broken down electricity emission factors by state.

In the UK, DEFRA provides emission factors going back to 2002 covering scope 1, 2 and 3. DEFRA no longer provide international emission factors and refer visitors to the IEA who provide free highlights and paid for details covering Scope 1 and 2.

Carbon footprints of geographical areas

National Carbon Footprints 

According to The World Bank, the global average carbon footprint in 2014 was 4.97 metric tons CO2/cap. The EU average for 2007 was about 13.8 tons CO2e/cap, whereas for the U.S., Luxembourg and Australia it was over 25 tons CO2e/cap. In 2017, the average for the USA was about 20 metric tons CO2e.

Mobility (driving, flying & small amount from public transit), shelter (electricity, heating, construction) and food are the most important consumption categories determining the carbon footprint of a person. In the EU, the carbon footprint of mobility is evenly split between direct emissions (e.g. from driving private cars) and emissions embodied in purchased products related to mobility (air transport service, emissions occurring during the production of cars and during the extraction of fuel). In low carbon economies such as Sweden and France the majority of household carbon is in imported goods 65% and 51% respectively.

The carbon footprint of U.S. households is about 5 times greater than the global average. For most U.S. households the single most important action to reduce their carbon footprint is driving less or switching to a more efficient vehicle.

Sub-national or local Carbon Footprints 
As well as calculating carbon footprints for whole countries, it is also possible to calculate the footprint of regions, cities, and neighbourhoods.

Carbon footprints of energy consumption

Three studies concluded that hydroelectric, wind, and nuclear power produced the least CO2 per kilowatt-hour of any other electricity sources.
These figures do not include emissions due to accidents or terrorism. Wind power and solar power emit no carbon from their operation, but do leave a footprint during construction and maintenance. Hydropower from reservoirs also has large footprints from initial removal of vegetation and ongoing methane (stream detritus decays anaerobically to methane in bottom of reservoir, rather than aerobically to CO2 if it had stayed in an unrestricted stream).

The generation of electricity accounts for about half of the world's man-made CO2 output. The CO2 footprint for heat is equally significant and research shows that using waste heat from power generation in combined heat and power district heating, chp/dh has the lowest carbon footprint, much lower than micro-power or heat pumps.

Coal production has been refined to greatly reduce carbon emissions; since the 1980s, the amount of energy used to produce a ton of steel has decreased by 50%.

Carbon footprints of transport 

This section gives representative figures for the carbon footprint of the fuel burned by different transport types (not including the carbon footprints of the vehicles or related infrastructure themselves). The precise figures vary according to a wide range of factors.

Flight

Some representative figures for CO2 emissions are provided by LIPASTO's survey of average direct emissions (not accounting for high-altitude radiative effects) of airliners expressed as CO2 and CO2 equivalent per passenger kilometre:
 Domestic, short distance, less than : 257 g/km CO2 or 259 g/km (14.7 oz/mile) CO2e
 Long-distance flights: 113 g/km CO2 or 114 g/km (6.5 oz/mile) CO2e

However, emissions per unit distance travelled is not necessarily the best indicator for the carbon footprint of air travel, because the distances covered are commonly longer than by other modes of travel. It is the total emissions for a trip that matters for a carbon footprint, not merely the rate of emissions. For example, because air travel makes rapid long-distance travel feasible, a holiday destination may be chosen that is much more distant than if another mode of travel were used.

Road
CO2 emissions per passenger-kilometre (pkm) for all road travel for 2011 in Europe as provided by the European Environment Agency:
 109g/kmCO2 (Figure 2)

For vehicles, average figures for CO2 emissions per kilometer for road travel for 2013 in Europe, normalized to the NEDC test cycle, are provided by the International Council on Clean Transportation:
 Newly registered passenger cars: 127gCO2/km
 Hybrid-electric vehicles: 92gCO2/km
 Light commercial vehicles (LCV): 175gCO2/km

Average figures for the United States are provided by the US Environmental Protection Agency, based on the EPA Federal Test Procedure, for the following categories:
 Passenger cars: 200gCO2/km (322g/mi)
 Trucks: 280gCO2/km (450g/mi)
 Combined: 229gCO2/km (369g/mi)

Rail

Shipping

Carbon footprints of products 

Several organizations offer footprint calculators for public and corporate use, and several organizations have calculated carbon footprints of products. The US Environmental Protection Agency has addressed paper, plastic (candy wrappers), glass, cans, computers, carpet and tires. Australia has addressed lumber and other building materials. Academics in Australia, Korea and the US have addressed paved roads. Companies, nonprofits and academics have addressed mailing letters and packages. Carnegie Mellon University has estimated the CO2 footprints of 46 large sectors of the economy in each of eight countries. Carnegie Mellon, Sweden and the Carbon Trust have addressed foods at home and in restaurants.

The Carbon Trust has worked with UK manufacturers on foods, shirts and detergents, introducing a CO2 label in March 2007. The label is intended to comply with a new British Publicly Available Specification (i.e. not a standard), PAS 2050, and is being actively piloted by The Carbon Trust and various industrial partners. As of August 2012 The Carbon Trust state they have measured 27,000 certifiable product carbon footprints.

Evaluating the package of some products is key to figuring out the carbon footprint. The key way to determine a carbon footprint is to look at the materials used to make the item. For example, a juice carton is made of an aseptic carton, a beer can is made of aluminum, and some water bottles either made of glass or plastic. The larger the size, the larger the footprint will be.

Food

Food contributes 10-30% of a household’s carbon footprint, mainly attributed to agricultural practices like food production and transportation. Meat products have larger carbon footprints than plant products like vegetables and grains due to inefficient conversion of plant energy to animals, and the release of methane from manure. In a 2014 study by Scarborough et al., the real-life diets of British people were surveyed and their dietary greenhouse gas footprints estimated. Average dietary greenhouse-gas emissions per day (in kilograms of carbon dioxide equivalent) were:
 7.19 for high meat-eaters
 5.63 for medium meat-eaters
 4.67 for low meat-eaters
 3.91 for fish-eaters
 3.81 for vegetarians
 2.89 for vegans

Textiles
The precise carbon footprint of different textiles varies considerably according to a wide range of factors. However, studies of textile production in Europe suggest the following carbon dioxide equivalent emissions footprints per kilo of textile at the point of purchase by a consumer:
 Cotton: 8
 Nylon: 5.43
 PET (e.g. synthetic fleece): 5.55
 Wool: 5.48

Accounting for durability and energy required to wash and dry textile products, synthetic fabrics generally have a substantially lower carbon footprint than natural ones.

Materials
The carbon footprint of materials (also known as embodied carbon) varies widely. The carbon footprint of many common materials can be found in the Inventory of Carbon & Energy database, the GREET databases and models, and LCA databases via openLCA Nexus. The carbon footprint of any manufactured product should be verified by a third-party.

Cement

Cement production gives a major contribution to CO2 emissions.

Carbon footprint of political choices 
The concept of a political "carbon footprint" measuring individuals' political choices (e.g. voting) were first introduced in 2021 for the election in Canada by Seth Wynes, Matthew Motta, and Simon Donner; and in parallel for Germany and the UK by Jakob Thomä. This research represents the first attempt to expand the concept of a personal footprint beyond consumption and investment footprints. The analysis for the election in Canada suggests the median "pro-climate" vote translated to 34.2 tons of CO2e emissions reduction, compared to a 2 ton reduction of living car free. The analysis for Germany and UK measured relative footprint reductions by switching the vote to more "pro-climate parties". In the German Elections in 2021, a German voter would have reduced around 7 tons of CO2e emissions per year when switching from the SPD (Labour) party to the Green party, compared to 3 tons associated with switching to a more "sustainable lifestyle". Political carbon footprints typically find significantly higher emissions reduction potential than consumption or investment footprints, given that consumption footprints only capture effects on your own behavior whereas voters determine climate outcomes for both voters for the winning party, voters for the losing party, and non-voters.

Financed emissions 
The carbon footprinting of financial portfolios (so-called "financed emissions") has its origin in the mid-2000's with initiatives from investors (Henderson and Pictet AM) and NGOs seeking to hold banks and investors to account with regard to their carbon footprint. The 2° Investing Initiative conducted the first review of financed emissions methodologies in 2013. The Montreal Carbon Pledge is the first formal footprinting pledge by financial institutions. Overseen by the PRI, it has attracted commitment from over 120 investors with over US$10 trillion in assets under management, as of the United Nations Climate Change Conference (COP21) in December 2015 in Paris. There are a range of financed emisisons data and methodology providers across major financial service providers (e.g. ISS, MSCI, S&P Sustainable1). The Partnership for Carbon Accounting Financial (PCAF) is an industry initiative designed to standardize the accounting principles underpinning financed emissions. The use of the carbon footprint concept is not without controversy however, as the translation of the footprinting logic to financial instruments comes with a number of challenges and caveats, including the need to normalize by financial variables that distort the results and data qualty. As a result, many major climate target-setting initiatives focus on forward-looking portfolio alignment methodologies (e.g. PACTA).

Causes 

Although some production of greenhouse gases is natural, human activity has increased the production substantially. Major industrial sources of greenhouse gases are power plants, residential buildings, and road transportation, as well as energy industry processes and losses, iron and steel manufacturing, coal mining, and chemical and petrochemical industries. Changes in the environment also contribute the increase in greenhouse gas emission such as, deforestation, forest degradation and land use changes, livestock, agricultural soils and water, and wastewater. China is the largest contributor of greenhouse gas, causing up 30% of the total emissions. The United States contributes 15%, followed by the EU with 9%, then India with 7%, Russia with 5%, Japan with 4%, and other miscellaneous countries making up the remaining 30%.

Although carbon dioxide (CO2) is the most prevalent gas, it is not the most damaging. Carbon dioxide is essential to life because animals release it during cellular respiration when they breathe and plants use it for photosynthesis. Carbon dioxide is released naturally by decomposition, ocean release and respiration. Humans increase Earth's carbon dioxide emissions in many different ways, including burning fossil fuels, deforestation, and cement production.

Methane (CH4) is largely released by coal, oil, and natural gas industries. Although methane is not mass-produced like carbon dioxide, it is still very prevalent. Methane is more harmful than carbon dioxide because it traps heat better than CO2. Methane is a main component in natural gas. Recently industries as well as consumers have been using natural gas because they believe that it is better for the environment since it contains less CO2. However, this is not the case because methane is actually more harmful to the environment.

Nitrous oxide (N2O) is released by fuel combustion, most of which comes from coal fired power plants, agricultural and industrial activities.

Fluorinated gases include hydroflucarbons (HFCs), perfluorocarbons (PFCs), sulfur hexafluoride (SF6), and nitrogen trifluoride (NF3). These gases have no natural source and are solely products of human activity. The biggest cause of these sources is the usage of ozone depleting substances; such as refrigerants, aerosol, propellants, foam blowing agents, solvents, and fire retardants.

The production of all of these gases contributes to one's GHG footprint. The more that these gases are produced, the higher the GHG footprint.

Rise in greenhouse gas over time 

Since the Industrial Revolution, greenhouse gas emissions have increased immensely. As of 2017, the carbon dioxide (CO2) levels are 142%, of what they were pre-industrial revolution. Methane is up 253% and nitrous oxide is 121% of pre-industrial levels. The energy driven consumption of fossil fuels has made GHG emissions rapidly increase, causing the Earth's temperature to rise. In the past 250 years, human activity such as, burning fossil fuels and cutting down carbon-absorbing forests, have contributed greatly to this increase. In the last 25 years alone, emissions have increased by more than 33%, most of which comes from carbon dioxide, accounting for three-fourths of this increase.

Reducing carbon footprints

Ways to reduce personal carbon footprint
A July 2017 study published in Environmental Research Letters found that the most significant way individuals could mitigate their own carbon footprint is to have one less child ("an average for developed countries of 58.6 tonnes CO2-equivalent (tCO2e) emission reductions per year"), followed by living car-free (2.4 tonnes CO2-equivalent per year), forgoing air travel (1.6 tonnes CO2-equivalent per trans-Atlantic trip) and adopting a plant-based diet (0.8 tonnes CO2-equivalent per year). The study also found that most government resources on climate change focus on actions that have a relatively modest effect on greenhouse gas emissions, and concludes that "a US family who chooses to have one fewer child would provide the same level of emissions reductions as 684 teenagers who choose to adopt comprehensive recycling for the rest of their lives".

An option is to drive less. Walking, biking, carpooling, mass transportation and combining trips result in burning less fuel and releasing fewer emissions into the atmosphere.

The choice of diet is a major influence on a person's carbon footprint. Animal sources of protein (especially red meat), rice (typically produced in high methane-emitting paddies), foods transported long-distance or via fuel-inefficient transport (e.g., highly perishable produce flown long-distance) and heavily processed and packaged foods are among the major contributors to a high carbon diet. Scientists at the University of Chicago have estimated "that the average American diet – which derives 28% of its calories from animal foods – is responsible for approximately one and a half more tonnes of greenhouse gasses – as  equivalents – per person, per year than a fully plant-based, or vegan, diet." Their calculations suggest that even replacing one third of the animal protein in the average American's diet with plant protein (e.g., beans, grains) can reduce the diet's carbon footprint by half a tonne. Exchanging two-thirds of the animal protein with plant protein is roughly equivalent to switching from a Toyota Camry to a Prius. Finally, throwing food out not only adds its associated carbon emissions to a person or household's footprint, but it also adds the emissions of transporting the wasted food to the garbage dump and the emissions of food decomposition, mostly in the form of the highly potent greenhouse gas, methane.

Options to reduce the carbon footprint of humans include Reduce, Reuse, Recycle, Refuse. This can be done by using reusable items such as thermoses for daily coffee or plastic containers for water and other cold beverages rather than disposable ones. If that option isn't available, it is best to properly recycle the disposable items after use.

Another option for reducing the carbon footprint of humans is to use less air conditioning and heating in the home. By adding insulation to the walls and attic of one's home, and installing weather stripping, or caulking around doors and windows one can lower their heating costs more than 25 percent. Similarly, one can very inexpensively upgrade the "insulation" (clothing) worn by residents of the home. For example, it's estimated that wearing a base layer of long underwear with top and bottom, made from a lightweight, super-insulating fabric like microfleece, can conserve as much body heat as a full set of clothing, allowing a person to remain warm with the thermostat lowered by over 5 °C. These measures all help because they reduce the amount of energy needed to heat and cool the house. One can also turn down the heat while sleeping at night or away during the day, and keep temperatures moderate at all times. Setting the thermostat just 2 degrees lower in winter and higher in summer could save about 1 ton of carbon dioxide each year.

The carbon handprint movement emphasizes individual forms of carbon offsetting, like using more public transportation or planting trees in deforested regions, to reduce one's carbon footprint and increase their "handprint."

Ways to reduce industry's carbon footprint

The most powerful industrial climate actions are:
refrigerant management (90 billion tonnes of CO2e 2017–2050, since refrigerants have thousands of times the warming potential of CO2); land-based wind turbines for electricity (85 billion); reduced food waste (71 billion); and restoring tropical forests by ending use of the land for other purposes (61 billion). They calculate benefits cumulatively to 2050, rather than annually, because industrial actions have long lead times.

A product, service, or company's carbon footprint can be affected by several factors including, but not limited to:
 Energy sources
 Offsite electricity generation
 Materials

These factors can also change with location or industry. However, there are some general steps that can be taken to reduce carbon footprint on a larger scale.

In 2016, the EIA reported that in the US electricity is responsible for roughly 37% of Carbon Dioxide emissions, making it a potential target for reductions. Possibly the cheapest way to do this is through energy efficiency improvements. The ACEEE reported that energy efficiency has the potential to save the US over 800 billion kWh per year, based on 2015 data. Some potential options to increase energy efficiency include, but are not limited to:
 Waste heat recovery systems
 Insulation for large buildings and combustion chambers
 Technology upgrades, ie different light sources, lower consumption machines

Carbon footprint from energy consumption can be reduced through the development of nuclear power (a zero carbon emissions energy source) and alternative energy projects, such as solar and wind energy, which are renewable resources.

Reforestation, the restocking of existing forests or woodlands that have previously been depleted, is an example of Carbon Offsetting, the counteracting of carbon dioxide emissions with an equivalent reduction of carbon dioxide in the atmosphere. Carbon offsetting can reduce a companies overall carbon footprint by offering a carbon credit.

Supply chain emissions (scope 3) are on average 11.4 times higher than operational emissions, more than double previous estimates, due to suppliers improving their emissions accounting. Therefore, there is an increasing focus on companies reducing their emissions coming from their suppliers as a way to reduce risks and capture opportunities.

A life cycle or supply chain carbon footprint study can provide useful data which will help the business to identify specific and critical areas for improvement. By calculating or predicting a process’ carbon footprint high emissions areas can be identified and steps can be taken to reduce in those areas. Collecting real data from suppliers emissions, setting a strategy focused on hot-spots and incentivizing suppliers are still barriers for companies. Nevertheless, solutions exist and the focus should be on improving year-on-year.

Schemes to reduce carbon emissions 
Carbon dioxide emissions into the atmosphere, and the emissions of other GHGs, are often associated with the burning of fossil fuels, like natural gas, crude oil and coal. While this is harmful to the environment, carbon offsets can be purchased in an attempt to make up for these harmful effects.

The Kyoto Protocol defines legally binding targets and timetables for cutting the GHG emissions of industrialized countries that ratified the Kyoto Protocol. Accordingly, from an economic or market perspective, one has to distinguish between a mandatory market and a voluntary market. Typical for both markets is the trade with emission certificates:
 Certified Emission Reduction (CER)
 Emission Reduction Unit (ERU)
 Verified Emission Reduction (VER)

Mandatory market mechanisms 
To reach the goals defined in the Kyoto Protocol, with the least economical costs, the following flexible mechanisms were introduced for the mandatory market:
 Clean Development Mechanism (CDM)
 Joint Implementation (JI)
 Emissions trading

The CDM and JI mechanisms requirements for projects which create a supply of emission reduction instruments, while Emissions Trading allows those instruments to be sold on international markets.
 Projects which are compliant with the requirements of the CDM mechanism generate Certified Emissions Reductions (CERs).
 Projects which are compliant with the requirements of the JI mechanism generate Emission Reduction Units (ERUs).

The CERs and ERUs can then be sold through Emissions Trading. The demand for the CERs and ERUs being traded is driven by:
 Shortfalls in national emission reduction obligations under the Kyoto Protocol.
 Shortfalls amongst entities obligated under local emissions reduction schemes.

Nations which have failed to deliver their Kyoto emissions reductions obligations can enter Emissions Trading to purchase CERs and ERUs to cover their treaty shortfalls. Nations and groups of nations can also create local emission reduction schemes which place mandatory carbon dioxide emission targets on entities within their national boundaries. If the rules of a scheme allow, the obligated entities may be able to cover all or some of any reduction shortfalls by purchasing CERs and ERUs through Emissions Trading. While local emissions reduction schemes have no status under the Kyoto Protocol itself, they play a prominent role in creating the demand for CERs and ERUs, stimulating Emissions Trading and setting a market price for emissions.

A well-known mandatory local emissions trading scheme is the EU Emissions Trading Scheme (EU ETS).

New changes are being made to the trading schemes. The EU Emissions Trading Scheme is set to make some new changes within the next year. The new changes will target the emissions produced by flight travel in and out of the European Union.

Other nations are scheduled to start participating in Emissions Trading Schemes within the next few years. These nations include China, India and the United States.

Voluntary market mechanisms 
In contrast to the strict rules set out for the mandatory market, the voluntary market provides companies with different options to acquire emissions reductions. A solution, comparable with those developed for the mandatory market, has been developed for the voluntary market, the Verified Emission Reductions (VER). This measure has the great advantage that the projects/activities are managed according to the quality standards set out for CDM/JI projects but the certificates provided are not registered by the governments of the host countries or the Executive Board of the UNO. As such, high quality VERs can be acquired at lower costs for the same project quality. However, at present VERs can not be used in mandatory market.

The voluntary market in North America is divided between members of the Chicago Climate Exchange and the Over The Counter (OTC) market. The Chicago Climate Exchange is a voluntary yet legally binding cap-and-trade emission scheme whereby members commit to the capped emission reductions and must purchase allowances from other members or offset excess emissions. The OTC market does not involve a legally binding scheme and a wide array of buyers from the public and private spheres, as well as special events that want to go carbon neutral. Being carbon neutral refers to achieving net zero carbon emissions by balancing a measured amount of carbon released with an equivalent amount sequestered or offset, or buying enough carbon credits to make up the difference.

There are project developers, wholesalers, brokers, and retailers, as well as carbon funds, in the voluntary market. Some businesses and nonprofits in the voluntary market encompass more than just one of the activities listed above. A report by Ecosystem Marketplace shows that carbon offset prices increase as it moves along the supply chain—from project developer to retailer.

While some mandatory emission reduction schemes exclude forest projects, these projects flourish in the voluntary markets. A major criticism concerns the imprecise nature of GHG sequestration quantification methodologies for forestry projects. However, others note the community co-benefits that forestry projects foster.
Project types in the voluntary market range from avoided deforestation, afforestation/reforestation, industrial gas sequestration, increased energy efficiency, fuel switching, methane capture from coal plants and livestock, and even renewable energy. Renewable Energy Certificates (RECs) sold on the voluntary market are quite controversial due to additionality concerns. Industrial Gas projects receive criticism because such projects only apply to large industrial plants that already have high fixed costs. Siphoning off industrial gas for sequestration is considered picking the low hanging fruit; which is why credits generated from industrial gas projects are the cheapest in the voluntary market.

The Taskforce on Scaling Voluntary Carbon Markets (TSVCM), an initiative led by ex-governor of the Bank of England Mark Carney, aims to bring more outstanding quality and integrity to the voluntary carbon markets. The TSVCM during 2023 will seek to create a set of Core Carbon Principles (CCPs) and mechanisms to simplify companies access to high-integrity credits and provide banks and investors confidence for financing carbon projects and trading credits.

The size and activity of the voluntary carbon market are difficult to measure. The market size of voluntary carbon offsets market in 2021 is expected to hit $1 billion.

Solutions

Everyday life changes 

There are many simple changes that can be made to the everyday lifestyle of a person that would reduce their GHG footprint. Reducing energy consumption within a household can include lowering one's dependence on air conditioning and heating, using LED lamps, choosing ENERGY STAR appliances, recycling, using cold water to wash clothes, avoiding a dryer, and eating less meat. Another adjustment would be reducing one's reliance on gas combustion-based motor vehicles, which produce many GHGs. One could also lower their footprint by taking direct flights during air traveling. While making these changes won't bring down one's carbon footprint overnight, they will make a significant difference long term.

Lifestyles and systemic changes 
Sustainable living refers to ways of living that are found to be sustainable within the Earth system or by which one purposely attempts to reduce an individual's or society's use of the Earth's natural resources, and one's personal resources. Studies found that systemic change for "decarbonization" of humanity's economic structures or root-cause system changes above politics are required for a substantial impact on global warming. Such changes may result in sustainable lifestyles, along with associated products, services and expenditures, being structurally supported and becoming sufficiently prevalent and effective in terms of collective greenhouse gas emission reductions.

Reducing greenhouse gases

Reduction of carbon dioxide 
In order to decrease CO2 emissions, the reliance of fossil fuels must be lowered. These fuels produce much CO2 across all forms of their usage. Alternatively, renewable sources are cleaner for the environment.

Household energy conservation measures include increasing insulation in construction, using fuel-efficient vehicles and ENERGY STAR appliances, and unplugging electrical items when not in use.

Reduction of methane 
Reducing methane gas emissions can be accomplished in several ways. Capturing CH4 emissions from coal mines and landfills, are two ways of reducing these emissions. Manure management and livestock operations is another possible solution. Motor vehicles use fossil fuels, which produces , but fossil fuels also produce  as a byproduct. Thus, better technology for these vehicles to avoid leakage as well as technologies that reduce their use would be beneficial.

Reduction of nitrous oxide 
Nitrous oxide (N2O) is often given off as a byproduct in various ways. Nylon production and fossil fuel usage are two ways that N2O is given off as a byproduct. Thus, improving technology for nylon production and the gathering of fossil fuels would greatly reduce nitrous oxide emissions. Also, many fertilizers have a nitrogenous base. A decrease in usage of these fertilizers, or changing their components, are more ways to reduce N2O emissions.

Reduction of fluorinated gases 
Although fluorinated gases are not produced on a massive scale, they have the worst effect on the environment. A reduction of fluorinated gas emissions can be done in many ways. Many industries that emit these gases can capture or recycle them. These same industries can also invest in more advanced technology that will not produce these gases. A reduction of leakage within power grids and motor vehicles will also decrease the emissions of fluorinated gases. There are also many air conditioning systems that emit fluorinated gases, thus an update in technology would decrease these emissions.

See also 

 Carbon intensity
 Carbon literacy
 Ecological footprint
 Environmental impact of aviation
 Food miles
 Global warming
 Land footprint
 Life cycle assessment
 List of countries by greenhouse gas emissions per capita
 Low carbon diet
 Remote work
 Veganism
 Water footprint

Notes

References 

 Association, Press (2014-09-09). "Greenhouse gas emissions rise at fastest rate for 30 years". The Guardian. ISSN 0261-3077. Retrieved 2017-11-03. 
 Climate change 2014. (2015). Retrieved from INTERGOVERNMENTAL PANEL website: http://www.ipcc.ch/pdf/assessment-report/ar5/syr/SYR_AR5_FINAL_full_wcover.pdf
 "CO₂ and other Greenhouse Gas Emissions". Our World in Data. Retrieved 2017-11-03.
 Division, US EPA, Office of Air and Radiation, Office of Atmospheric Programs, Climate Change. "Household Carbon Footprint Calculator". www3.epa.gov. Retrieved 2017-11-01
 EPA, OA, US. "Climate Change Indicators: Greenhouse Gases | US EPA". US EPA. Retrieved 2017-11-08
 EPA, OA, US. "Global Greenhouse Gas Emissions Data | US EPA". US EPA. Retrieved 2017-11-03.
 EPA, OA, US. "Overview of Greenhouse Gases | US EPA". US EPA. Retrieved 2017-11-01
 Holli, Riebeek, (2010-06-03). "Global Warming : Feature Articles". earthobservatory.nasa.gov. Retrieved 2017-11-03.
 Howarth, Robert W. (2014-06-01). "A bridge to nowhere: methane emissions and the greenhouse gas footprint of natural gas". Energy Science & Engineering. 2 (2): 47–60. . 
 Snyder, C. S.; Bruulsema, T. W.; Jensen, T. L.; Fixen, P. E. (2009-10-01). "Review of greenhouse gas emissions from crop production systems and fertilizer management effects". Agriculture, Ecosystems & Environment. Reactive nitrogen in agroecosystems: Integration with greenhouse gas interactions. 133 (3): 247–266. .
 "The Carbon Dioxide Greenhouse Effect". history.aip.org. Retrieved 2017-11-01.

External links
 The GHG Protocol

Environmental impact of the energy industry
Greenhouse gas emissions
Environmental indices
Environmental terminology
Articles containing video clips